Frank Effenberger is an American electrical engineer. He is currently Vice President and Fellow of Fixed Access Networks at FutureWei Technologies.

Effenberger completed his undergraduate studies in 1988 at Stevens Institute of Technology, where he majored in engineering and engineering physics. He completed a master's degree at University of Rochester's Institute of Optics.
He earned a PhD from the University of Central Florida College of Optics and Photonics. His doctoral thesis was titled Signal and noise in sprite detectors. After graduating, he studied passive optical networks (PONs) at Bellcore. In 2000, he served as director of systems engineering at Quantum Bridge Technologies (later Motorola). He became director of FTTX at Huawei in 2006. In 2011, Effenberger and colleagues published a paper describing the world's first field trial of XG-PON.

Since 2009, Effenberger has served as a rapporteur for Q2/15 (WP1/15) on optical systems for fibre access networks in Study Group 15 on optical transport networks and access network infrastructures of the International Telecommunication Union. He chairs the IEEE 802.3cp task force.

Effenberger was elected as a Fellow of the Optical Society (OSA) in 2015. That year, he was additionally named a Fellow of the Institute of Electrical and Electronics Engineers (IEEE) for contributions to passive optical networking standards and technology.
He was also honored by the UCF Alumni Association with their Professional Achievement Award.

References 

Living people
Stevens Institute of Technology alumni
University of Rochester alumni
University of Central Florida alumni
Fellows of Optica (society)
Fellow Members of the IEEE
21st-century American engineers
Year of birth missing (living people)
Huawei people
American electrical engineers